Muda Hashim Secondary School (abbreviated as SMMHT) is a government boys' secondary school in Tutong, the town of Tutong District in Brunei. The school provides five years of general secondary education leading up to O Level qualification. It has 636 students. The current principal is Mohamad Saiful Bahrin bin Sabri.

Name 
Muda Hashim Secondary School is named after Pengiran Muda Hashim bin Pengiran Anak Abdul Rahman, a member of the Brunei royal family. It is not to be confused with Raja Muda Hashim, a son of a Brunei Sultan who lived in the nineteenth century and played a significant role in the involvement of James Brooke in the history of Sarawak.

Location 
The official location address of the school is Bukit Bendera which is a village subdivision under Pekan Tutong, a mukim in Tutong District. Muda Hashim Secondary School is located in the area of Bukit Bendera which is not incorporated as part of the municipal area of Tutong.

History 
The secondary education that would become the basis of Muda Hashim Secondary School began in 1961 with the introduction of grades beyond Primary VI at Muda Hashim Primary School, then known as Muda Hashim Malay School. In 1966,  (First Malay Secondary School) was established in the capital which provided secondary education in what was then the Malay stream. Subsequently, the secondary section at Muda Hashim Malay School became another  with the separation of administration from the primary section as well as the introduction of the principal as its head.

On 1 May 1971, the secondary school moved to its present ground and in the following year adopted the name  (Muda Hashim Malay Secondary School). The school eventually dropped the word 'Melayu' or 'Malay' from its name some time after it introduced the English stream and when English eventually becomes the predominant language of instruction, as it is today.

Muda Hashim Secondary School became a single-sex secondary school, admitting only boys, beginning in 1998. At present, there are three boys' secondary school in the country, the other two being Sultan Omar Ali Saifuddien College and Ma'had Islam Brunei. It is also one of seven single-sex secondary schools nationwide, the remaining four admitting only female students.

Academics 
The school provides secondary education which begins at Year 7. Generally, students will study for five years, that is until Year 11. However, a few students may opt to finish in only four years, that is by Year 10, through the 'Express' scheme of the SPN-21. Either way, the studies culminate in the sitting of GCE O Level and/or IGCSE examination.

Academic Programmes include a 2 year common curriculum in year 7 and 8, then proceed to either the express programme, general programme, applied programme & special applied programme. In the special Applied Programmes, students are able to take Pearson BTEC courses at up to level 2.

The school also believes in inclusive education where students with special needs are either going through the same programme as other students or a specialized pre Vocational programme within the school itself.

Some students may proceed to sixth form, in which students that reside in this district shall enrol in the Tutong Sixth Form Centre. Others may proceed to the technical and vocational schools, particularly schools under the Institute of Brunei Technical Education, which are outside of the district.

See also 
 List of secondary schools in Brunei

References 

Secondary schools in Brunei
Cambridge schools in Brunei